The Eighth Area Army was an area army of the Imperial Japanese Army. The army was formed on 9 November 1942, becoming effective on 26 November at Rabaul as part of the Southern Army. The army was disbanded in September 1945.

Commanders 
General Hitoshi Imamura (9 Nov 1942 - Sep 1945)

Chief of Staff
Lt. General Rinpei Kato (9 Nov 1942 - Sep 1945)

Vice Chief of Staff 
Maj. General Ketsu Sato (9 Nov 1942 - 2 Aug 1943)  
Maj. General Yadoru Arisue (2 Aug 1943 - 29 Aug 1943)  
Maj. General Kohei Takeshi (11 Sep 1943 - 19 Jun 1944)

Organisation
Seventeenth Army
Eighteenth Army
6th Division
1st Independent Mixed Brigade
12th Air Brigade
Part of the 5th Division (20 November 1942)
6th Air Division (25 November 1942)
7th Air Division (29 January 1943)

Notes

Military units and formations established in 1942
Military units and formations disestablished in 1945